This is a list of Ice Hockey Superleague seasons from its inception to its disbandment:

1996–97 ISL season
1997–98 ISL season
1998–99 ISL season
1999–00 ISL season
2000–01 ISL season
2001–02 ISL season
2002–03 ISL season

References
Historic standings and statistics - at Internet Hockey Database